Thomas Hardwick (1752–1829) was an English architect.

Thomas Hardwick may also refer to:

 Thomas Hardwick Sr. (1725–1798), English master mason and architect
 Thomas W. Hardwick (1872–1944), American politician
 Thomas Hardwicke (1756–1835), British soldier and naturalist

See also
 Hardwick (disambiguation)